Tim Witherspoon (born December 27, 1957) is an American former professional boxer who competed from 1979 to 2003. He was a two-time world heavyweight champion, having held the WBC title in 1984, and the WBA title in 1986. Witherspoon also worked as a regular sparring partner for Muhammad Ali.

Professional career

Early years
Witherspoon had six amateur bouts, losing the last to Marvis Frazier on decision after getting knocked down.

Making his professional debut with a first-round TKO over Joe Adams on October 30, 1979, Witherspoon quickly rose through the ranks. In 1981, he participated in his first high-profile fight, knocking out future world cruiserweight champion Alfonzo Ratliff, after which he was signed by Don King. Witherspoon was a sparring partner of Ali as he was training to fight Larry Holmes and Trevor Berbick. Ali also gave Witherspoon his complimentary ring alias of "Terrible" Tim Witherspoon.

In 1982, he was matched with Renaldo Snipes, who had just given champion Larry Holmes a fair challenge (and knocked Holmes down), and outpointed him over 10 rounds, setting up his own challenge to Holmes.

Witherspoon vs. Larry Holmes: WBC heavyweight title
On May 20, 1983, Witherspoon would have his first attempt at earning a world title by taking on the recognized top man in the division World Boxing Council champion Larry Holmes at the Dunes Hotel in Las Vegas. Witherspoon gave Holmes all he could handle, including rocking him badly in the ninth round, before losing a disputed twelve round split decision.

He returned later in the year to outpoint Floyd "Jumbo" Cummings, who had drawn with Joe Frazier in Smokin' Joe's last fight, and win the NABF title with a first-round knockout of James "Quick" Tillis.

First title reign: WBC heavyweight champion
In December 1983, Holmes relinquished his WBC title rather than defend against Greg Page, and chose to accept that of the newly formed IBF (International Boxing Federation).

Witherspoon was matched with Page for the vacant title on March 9, 1984. Page, in constant war with promoter Don King, turned up overweight and was outpointed.

Witherspoon's reign as champion would not be long however, as soon he himself was in constant war with King, and on August 31 of that year he was outpointed by Pinklon Thomas via majority decision.

Second title reign: WBA heavyweight champion
In 1985 Witherspoon regained his NABF belt by beating James Broad in two rounds and made a successful twelve round defense against James "Bonecrusher" Smith in his first defense of the belt. This earned him another chance at a heavyweight title and he signed to fight reigning WBA champion Tony Tubbs on January 17, 1986 in Atlanta. Witherspoon won a close fight by majority decision, winning by only one point on one of the scorecards and three on another with one even, to become champion for a second time.

In his first defense of his newly won championship, Witherspoon traveled to London and fought a young up-and-coming English heavyweight and future world champion Frank Bruno at Wembley Stadium, as part of the heavyweight unification series. In the eleventh round of a scheduled fifteen, Witherspoon recorded a technical knockout and did something he had not done when he was champion the first time: make a successful defense of the title after winning it. After defeating Bruno, a rematch with Tony Tubbs loomed but Tubbs pulled out of the fight.

Needing to make a title defense, Witherspoon accepted a second fight with Bonecrusher Smith. Since dropping a lopsided decision in their first matchup (losing every round but one on all three scorecards) Smith had fought four bouts and recorded three wins, all against fringe contenders and journeymen. The fight was scheduled for December 12, 1986 at Madison Square Garden and Witherspoon a heavy favorite against the 17-5 Smith. With fifty seconds remaining in the first round, Witherspoon hit the canvas a third time and Rivera ended the proceedings. At ringside, HBO commentators Barry Tompkins, Larry Merchant, and Sugar Ray Leonard expressed disbelief at the outcome, with all three calling the bout a major upset.

Post-championship career
Following the end his second title reign, Witherspoon spent years in litigation against Don King. In 1991 won the USBA heavyweight title by defeating fellow contender Carl "The Truth" Williams but lost a points decision to Everett Martin. Ring magazine called this inexplicable loss the low point of his career.

In 1993 Don King settled out of court and paid Witherspoon a million dollars. By 1994 Witherspoon had won five fights in a row by knockout. Aged 38 he was signed by HBO and matched in high-profile fights with cruiserweight champion Al Cole and the Cuban amateur Jorge Luis González, both of whom he defeated. Later in the year he was matched with Ray Mercer but lost a 10-round decision.

After that loss Witherspoon laid off a year, and when he came back he was outpointed by Larry Donald on HBO, and, in 1998, lost a close decision when outworked by New Zealander Jimmy Thunder before travelling to Poland to be outpointed by Andrew Golota.

The 43-year-old Witherspoon resurfaced in 2001, knocking out the prospect David Bostice in one round, outpointing Cuban southpaw contender Eliecer Castillo and Syrian Ahmed Abdin, before his revival was ended by Lou Savarese, who stopped him in five rounds.

Witherspoon also competed in Cedric Kushner's 2003 Thunderbox Heavyweight Tournament, "Fistful of Dollars," but lost in the opening stages.

Life after boxing
Witherspoon resides near Philadelphia, Pennsylvania, where he trains boxers, including his son, lightweight Tim Witherspoon Jr and many others. He has also trained Light Heavyweight champion Clinton Woods in the U.K.

In 2014, Witherspoon published his book with the help of British entrepreneur Kevin Baker and ghost writer Ryan Danes.

Professional boxing record

References

External links

"Terrible" Times: A Life of Tim Witherspoon at boxing.com

1957 births
African-American boxers
Living people
World heavyweight boxing champions
World Boxing Association champions
Boxers from Philadelphia
American male boxers
World Boxing Council champions
21st-century African-American people
20th-century African-American sportspeople